Abe Kakepetum (September 12, 1944 – January 5, 2019) was a Canadian Anishinaabe painter, who began painting at age nine. Kakepetum was born in Sandy Lake First Nation in northwest Ontario, Canada and a member of  Keewaywin First Nation. His artistic production mirrors his culture's faith. Kakepetum was also a vocalist, recording a number of gospel albums.

Kakepetum primary medium is acrylic on canvas, Arches paper although he is not limited to these materials.  He has designed original art on Beaver skulls, on wooden plates  and on jewelry made of antlers. Kakepetum has produced limited edition prints which all bear the seal of his company Kakekay Fine Arts.  He developed his art and taught others about the spiritual meanings and traditional beliefs of his Aboriginal culture.

Kakepetum worked closely with Toronto designer Linda Lundstrom to create designs for her La Parka line of clothing.

External links 
 Abe Kakepetum's Website
 Kakekay Fine Arts: Abe Kakepetum
 Short interview in The Toronto Star
 The College Compensation and Appointments Council mention of his collaboration with Linda Lundström

References

1944 births
2019 deaths
Ojibwe people
People from Kenora District
First Nations painters
Woodlands style